The ARPA Host Name Server Protocol (NAMESERVER), is an obsolete network protocol used in translating a host name to an Internet address. IANA Transmission Control Protocol (TCP) and User Datagram Protocol (UDP) port 42 for NAMESERVER; this port is more commonly used by the Windows Internet Name Service (WINS) on Microsoft operating systems.

Application
The NAMESERVER protocol is used by the DARPA Trivial Name Server, a server process called tnamed that is provided in some implementations of UNIX.

Replacement
Support for the NAMESERVER protocol has been deprecated, and may not be available in the latest implementations of all UNIX operating systems. The Domain Name System (DNS) has replaced the ARPA Host Name Server Protocol and the DARPA Trivial Name Server.

See also 
 List of TCP and UDP port numbers
 List of Unix operating systems
 Domain Name System

References

External links
 IEN 116 Internet Name Server
 Development of the domain name system

Application layer protocols
Domain Name System